Football's Greatest is a TV series that started on 10 June 2010 and finished on 11 July 2010 on Sky Sports for the World Cup. There are 26 shows in total all narrated by Richard Keys, 25 featuring one footballer for each show. The first episode, The Contenders, is about players that did not make the following shows, though are still notable, including Denis Law, David Beckham, Thierry Henry, Paolo Rossi, Sócrates, Steven Gerrard, Hristo Stoichkov, Ryan Giggs, Hugo Sánchez, Dino Zoff, Emilio Butragueño, Kaká, Roberto Baggio, Luís Figo and Lionel Messi.

The series was then followed by Football's Greatest Managers around Christmas 2011, running to a similar format. This series was narrated by Gabriel Clarke and features shows for José Mourinho, Bill Shankly, Alex Ferguson, Bob Paisley, Giovanni Trapattoni, Fabio Capello, Arrigo Sacchi, Rinus Michels, Mário Zagallo and Ottmar Hitzfeld.

There were additional episodes created of Football's Greatest created in 2014, Andrés Iniesta, Ryan Giggs, Dennis Bergkamp, Steven Gerrard, Alan Shearer, Thierry Henry, Cristiano Ronaldo, Lionel Messi, Luís Figo and Clarence Seedorf.

Ten for Football's Greatest International Teams; Netherlands (1974, 1988), West Germany (1972-1974), Brazil (1958/1962, 1970, 1982), France (1984, 1998-2000), Hungary (1954), Spain (2008-2012).

Sixteen for Football's Greatest Club Teams; Chelsea, Manchester United, Barcelona, Arsenal, Bayern Munich, Real Madrid, Benfica, Celtic, Juventus, Liverpool, Milan, Santos, Red Star Belgrade, Nottingham Forest, PSV Eindhoven, Feyenoord and Ajax (1968–1973 and 1994–1997).

Players featured

Notes

Sky UK original programming
2010 British television series debuts
2010 British television series endings
2010s British sports television series